Theatron is a  gay bar, dance club, and nightclub complex in Bogotá, Colombia founded in 2002. It is the central point of the gay community of Bogota and is located in the central part of the Chapinero locality, the focus of the city's gay scene. Theatron has been described as the largest gay-themed club night in Latin America  and one of the biggest in the world. It can allow up to 5000 people on Saturday night.

Built in an old movie theater, the complex has 13 different dance floors with different musical styles and atmospheres, including one exclusively for women. The 13th area was opened for the 13th anniversary of the club. In the main room, there is usually a drag show or contest on Saturdays. There are two exclusive zones especifically for men or women.

References 

LGBT nightclubs
Gay culture
LGBT culture in Colombia
Music venues in Colombia
Companies of Colombia
2002 establishments
Music venues completed in 2002